The Vympel R-27 (NATO reporting name AA-10 Alamo) is a family of air-to-air missile developed by the Soviet Union. It remains in service with the Russian Air Force, air forces of the Commonwealth of Independent States and air forces of many other countries as standard medium range air-to-air missile even though they have the more advanced R-77.

The R-27 is manufactured in infrared-homing (R-27T, R-27ET), semi-active-radar-homing (R-27R, R-27ER), and active-radar-homing (R-27EA) versions. R-27 family missiles are produced by both Russian and Ukrainian manufacturers. The R-27 missile is carried by the Mikoyan MiG-29 and Sukhoi Su-27 family fighters. The R-27 missile is also license-produced in China, though the production license was bought from Ukraine instead of Russia.

Variants

 R-27R: AA-10 Alamo-A, semi-active radar homing. Missile can be used at 20 to 25,000 meters altitude (launch platform or target). Effective kill range for a target at same altitude: 2 to 42.5 km head-on, 0.7 to 7.5 km tail-on. Maximum range: 73 km. Maximum allowed vertical separation between target and launch platform: +/− 10 km.
 R-27R1: Export model of the R-27R.
 R-27T: AA-10 Alamo-B, infrared homing, passive homing using the Avtomatika 9B-1032 (PRGS-27) IR seeker head. Missile can be used at 20 to 25,000 meters altitude. Effective kill range for a target at same altitude: 2 to 33 km head-on, 0 to 5.5 km tail-on. Maximum range: 63 km. Maximum allowed vertical separation: +/−10 km.
 R-27T1: Export model of the R-27T.
 R-27ER: AA-10 Alamo-C, the semi-active-radar homing extended-range version. Missile can be used at 20 to 27,000 meters altitude. Effective kill range for a target at same altitude: 2 to 65.5 km head-on, 0.7 to 16.5 km tail-on. Missile cannot be fired at altitude less than 3 km against a target with background earth, if launch range is less than 6 kilometers. Maximum range: 117 km. Maximum allowed vertical separation: 12 km.
 R-27ER1: Export model of the R-27ER.
 R-27ET: AA-10 Alamo-D, the infrared-homing extended-range version, Weight 348 kg. Missile can be used at 20 to 27,000 meters altitude. Effective kill range: 2 to 52.5 km head-on, 0.7 to 12.5 tail-on. Maximum range: 104 km. Maximum allowed vertical separation: 12 km.
 R-27ET1: Export model of the R-27ET.

R-27R and ER variants can be used in any meteorological conditions. Launch can made at less than 5 g overload and less 50 deg/s roll rate. It is allowed to redesignate targets during flight, or sharing target illumination with other aircraft.

R-27T and ET variants can be used out of cloudiness, at least 15 degrees away from the bearing of sun, and 4 degrees away from the bearing of moon and ground-based heat-contrasting conditions. In cases of maximum head-on range launches where lock-command cannot be utilised, missile can not be fired. Seeker must acquire target before launch. On combat operations section of the Su-27 manual, this mode of usage is especially recommended for head-on usage for passive attacks at targets with 0 degrees approach angle (i.e. another fighter moving to intercept), leaving target unalerted to incoming missile.  Launch can be made at 0 to 7 g, but limited to 6 g if roll induced slip is more than 2× diameter of the ball.

Other Variants:
 R-27P AA-10 Alamo-E, passive radar homing with a range of up to 72 km.
 R-27EP AA-10 Alamo-F, a longer range passive anti-radiation missile with a range of up to 70 nm (110 km) 
 R-27EA, active radar homing with 9B-1103K active seeker, range of >130 km.
 R-27EM, active radar homing with 9B-1103K active seeker, range of >170 km.

Operational service

Ethiopia and Eritrea
In the 1999 Eritrean-Ethiopian War, Eritrean MiG-29s fought Ethiopian Su-27s both piloted by Russian mercenaries. Only one R-27 fired by an Ethiopian Su-27 at an Eritrean MiG-29 proximity-fuzed near enough the MiG that the damaged aircraft eventually crashed on landing.

Russia and Ukraine
During the War in Donbas, the Ukrainian Air Force claimed that one of its Su-25 was shot down by a Russian Air Force MiG-29 using a R-27T on 16 July 2014. Russian officials denied any involvement.

The R-27 was used by both sides during the 2022 Russian invasion of Ukraine.

Yemen
During the Yemeni Civil War (2015–present) Houthis have used R-27T missiles modified to serve as surface to air missiles. A video released on January 7, 2018, also shows a modified R-27T hitting a Saudi led coalition fighter on a Forward looking infrared camera. Houthi sources claim to have downed a F-15. Rebels later released footage showing an aircraft wreck, however serial numbers on the wreckage suggested that the downed aircraft was a Panavia Tornado, also operated by Saudi forces. On January 8, the Saudi Press Agency admitted the loss of an aircraft over Yemen, though it did not clarify whether it was a Tornado or an F-15, blaming the crash to 'a technical issue' and reporting that the pilots ejected and recovered by friendly forces.

On 21 March 2018, Houthi rebels released a video where they hit and possibly shot down a Saudi F-15 in Saada province. In the video a R-27T air to air missile adapted for surface to air use was launched, appearing to have successfully hit a jet. As in the video of the previous similar hit recorded on 8 January, the target, while clearly hit, did not appear to be downed. Saudi forces confirmed the hit, while saying the jet safely landed at a Saudi base. Saudi official sources confirmed the incident reporting that it happened at 3:48 pm local time after a surface-to-air defense missile was launched at the fighter jet from inside Saada airport.

Operators

Current operators
 
 
 
 
 
 
 
 
 
 
 
 
  – Ordered 300  missiles in 2019 & 800 in 2020 for Su-30MKI & MiG-29UPG aircraft. R-27R1/ER1 and R-27T1/ET1 variants.

Former operators
 
 
  (all given to West German Air Force in 1990)
  (all given to the Polish Air Force with MiG-29s in 2004)
 
 
  (passed on to successor states except ,  and )
 
 //Serbia and Montenegro

See also
 List of missiles
 R-77

Similar weapons
 AIM-7 Sparrow
 Aspide
 Super 530
 PL-11

References
Citations

Bibliography

External links

 Р-27
 Ruská raketa typu vzduch-vzduch R-27 (AA-10 Alamo)
 ГосМКБ «Вымпел» » Управляемые авиационные ракеты «воздух-воздух»

Anti-radiation missiles of Russia
Anti-radiation missiles of the Soviet Union
Air-to-air missiles of Russia
Air-to-air missiles of the Soviet Union
Cold War air-to-air missiles of the Soviet Union
Vympel NPO products
Military equipment introduced in the 1980s